Alan Pogue (born 1946 in Corpus Christi, Texas) is a photojournalist who works exclusively in black-and-white still documentary photography.  His career focuses on social justice and Texas politics from the early 1970s to the present.

Pogue's work is impelled by "unstoppable activism and commitment".  His striking images have an unimposing, intimate quality.  His travels have taken him around the world, including Cuba, Pakistan, Iraq, Chiapas, Haiti, Saudi Arabia, and Rio Grand valley of Texas.

Early years
Pogue was raised a Catholic in Corpus Christi. 
At the age of nine, Pogue had a vivid and detailed experience, when a mental picture of a street scene was imprinted in his mind, as if a photograph had been taken. Later he was drafted into the army. As a young chaplain headed to serve in the Vietnam War, his mother gave him a Kodak Instamatic.  She asked him to send her pictures because she knew he wasn't going to write.  Disillusioned with the U.S. Army Chaplain Corps he was assigned to, he volunteered as a front-line medic, with the 198th Light Infantry Brigade.  This took him to the front lines, providing ample opportunity for taking pictures.  These snapshots of G.I.s and Vietnamese piqued his interest and became the impetus for his career in documentary photography.

During the 1968 Tet offensive, he endured shelling and witnessed a member of his unit being shot to death, leading him to question the justification of the war.  Taking Instamatic snap shots in Vietnam was just the beginning of his career in photography.

Returning to the United States, Pogue enrolled in the University of Texas at Austin to study philosophy.  He became the staff photographer for the university's underground paper, The Rag, published in Austin, Texas, during the '60s and '70s.  By living frugally he was free to follow his heart and choose subjects he cared about.  He kept his rent low by living in a janitor's closet at the University YWCA, and he found free meals at Les Amis, a cafe that treated him as its artist-in-residence.  He survived on wedding and passport work plus his income from the Texas Observer, which paid him $5 a picture.

In 1980 Pogue had his first real photography show at Brazos Books.  It was there he met Russell Lee, a noted photographer from the depression era Farm Security Administration.  Lee befriended Pogue and became his mentor.  At their last meeting before Lee died in 1986 Lee made Pogue commit to never abandon black-and-white still photography.  Pogue promised and has kept his word.

Documenting social justice
Pogue found the University of Texas student protests against the Vietnam War a natural subject in 1970.  He also documented active-duty soldiers from Fort Hood, gathering in front of a G.I. coffeehouse, prior to demonstrating against the war in Killeen, Texas.  This led to a lifetime of photography that captures striking images of intimate human conditions, with an unwavering eye. His work focuses on social justice, and spans geographies from Cuba to Iraq.

A 1972 photograph documented the struggle of women and reproductive freedom. It shows a woman in the University YMCA on the phone, providing birth control and abortion information.  That woman later helped persuade Sarah Weddington to take on the landmark Roe v. Wade case.

During 1974, Pogue's lens captured civil rights protests on Austin's east side, where Brown Berets led hundreds of marchers to the police station to protest killings of Mexican American and African American youths by the police.  In 1982 he again documented a demonstration, this time after a Mexican American youth was killed by Dallas police.

His interest in social justice organizations grew and they became both the subject of his documentary photography and his politics.  He used showings of his photography to speak about social injustice.  His 1979 "The Short-Handled Hoe" from Hidalgo, Texas exposed the cruelty of growers forcing field workers to bend over solely to discern whether they were working.  He documented the work of the United Farm Workers, and photographed its leaders, Cesar Chavez and Dolores Huerta.  Pogue provided a 1993 photograph titled 'Farmworker Women' to support the National Center for Farmworker Health. The 'Migrant Clinicians Network' is a beneficiary of Pogue's support.

Pogue used his photography to document the plight of prisoners held in the Texas state prison system.  His 'Photographs from prison' supports the work of Citizens United for Rehabilitation of Errants (CURE) a grassroots organization of Texas origin. He has chronicled inmates sitting on Texas' death row.  His photographs appear in 'Behind the Walls: A Guide for Families and Friends of Texas Prison Inmates' by Antonio Antonio Renaud.

When members of the Christian Peacemaker Team chained themselves to a house in the West Bank in 1998, attempting to prevent its demolition by Israeli forces, Pogue preserved the moment on film.  In Jerusalem, his camera found members of Bat Shalom's Women in Black, while they protested the occupation of Palestine.

During the embargo of Iraq following the 1991 first Gulf War, Pogue went to Iraq, despite a State Department ban on travel there.  Near Basra he photographed an Iraqi girl, Asraa' Mizyad, whose arm was severed by fragment from a U.S. cruise missile.  This image is among Pogue's most well known.  He made five trips to Iraq with Veterans For Peace between 1998 and 2004.

Notable Texans
His lens captured many well known Texans, including, John Henry Faulk, Sissy Farenthold, Barbara Jordan, Molly Ivins, Ann Richards, Jim Hightower, and George Bush.  These photographs provide an intimate look at their humanity and remind the viewer of their essential qualities.  For example, his photograph of then-Governor George Bush, shows him with his cheeks puffed out in a classic expression of exasperation.

Present
Pogue won The Austin Chronicle's Best Photographer reader's poll six times and is the 2009 Best All Around Winner in the Media category.  In 1983 Pogue received the Dobie Paisano Fellowship, recognizing his writings related to Texas.

A longtime member of Veterans for Peace, Pogue has used his photography to support the organization.

Pogue is a staff photographer for the Texas Observer in Austin, Texas, starting there in 1971.  He continues his work at the Texas Center for Documentary Photography in Austin and supports the causes of justice that have been the core of his documentary photograph career.

During the coronavirus pandemic, Pogue journeyed to Oklahoma to cover President Donald Trump's June 20, 2020 Tulsa rally.  The Texas Observer provided Pogue a letter for the purpose of establishing press credentials. He was able to enter the Bank of America Center where the rally was held. While waiting for Trump to arrive, he heard something was happening outside. Pogue ventured outside and was taking photos, of Black Lives Matter protestors being arrested, when he came to the attention of the police.  They arrested him for 'obstruction' and took him to jail.  He was released the following day.

References

External links
 'Texas Center for Documentary Photography'
 Interview with Alan Pogue at the Texas After Violence Project. Retrieved 2010-11-12.
 'Behind the Walls: A Guide for Families and Friends of Texas Prison Inmates' by Antonio Antonio Renaud.
 Documentary photographer Alan Pogue on Rag Radio, interviewed by Thorne Dreyer, May 25, 2010 (59:04)

1946 births
Living people
United States Army personnel of the Vietnam War
American photojournalists
People from Corpus Christi, Texas
Journalists from Texas
United States Army soldiers